Pedro Pablo Peña Cañete (29 June 1864 – 29 July 1943) was provisional president of Paraguay from February 28, 1912 to March 22, 1912. He was a member of the Colorado Party. Before his brief presidency, Peña was secretary at the Paraguayan Legation in Argentina, dean of the Faculty of Medicine at the National University of Asuncion, president of the National University of Asuncion, Paraguayan minister to Brazil (1901–1902 and 1903–1905), minister of foreign affairs (1902–1903) and Paraguayan minister to Chile, Bolivia and Peru (1905–1908). During and after his presidency he was president of the executive committee of the Colorado Party from 1912 to 1916, and again from 1921 to 1923.

References

Sources
 Presidents of Paraguay

Presidents of Paraguay
1864 births
1943 deaths
Paraguayan physicians
Ambassadors of Paraguay to Brazil
Liberal Party (Paraguay) politicians